Radonia  is a village in the administrative district of Gmina Wielowieś, within Gliwice County, Silesian Voivodeship, in southern Poland.

The village has a population of 425.

References

Radonia